There are at least three places in the United States named Garden Grove:

 Garden Grove, California
 Garden Grove, Iowa
 Garden Grove, Florida

Garden Grove could also refer to:
 "Garden Grove", song by Sublime (band), named after Garden Grove, California